Penyrheol Comprehensive School is a secondary school in Gorseinon, Swansea, Wales.

Admissions
It has around 1,000 pupils from the Penyrheol, Gorseinon, and Loughor areas. It is situated just east of the B4296, accessed via two miles along the A4240 from junction 47 of the M4.

It does not have a sixth form. It serves Gorseinon, Loughor, Penyrheol, Kingsbridge and Garden Village.

History
It was formerly administered by West Glamorgan County Council (based in Swansea).

1976 fire
The school had to be rebuilt due to a fire in 1976 which destroyed half of the school. Thirty years later, much the same thing would happen again and a similar financial shortfall in the cost from what was available from insurance cover.

2006 fire 
On Saturday 18 March 2006 from around 2 - 6am the school was largely destroyed by arson when the school was largely engulfed in a blaze. Strong winds added to the fire. The whole main building was destroyed leaving only the drama studio, sports hall, and annex which contained the English and Welsh departments as well as one ICT room. Much course work was lost in the blaze. 40 classrooms were destroyed. Only the English and Maths departments survived. 60 firefighters fought the blaze for four hours. Water from the pool in the leisure centre was used to fight the fire.

Many teachers lost valuable work that was irreplaceable. Artwork was completely destroyed.

On 30 November 2006, 18-year-old Jonathan Giles, was sentenced to six years for starting the fire, having been arrested on 19 March 2006. He denied the charge of burglary. It was started in a bag of paper meant for recycling. On leaving the building they took some fire extinguishers which they used to spray some local girls. Not all of Swansea Council's insurance covered the fire damage.

New building
The school now has a new £9.9 million building which was opened 4 September 2009, Designed by Stride Treglown and built by Carillion, and includes a sprinkler system and more CCTV. This new building now contains all the specialist teaching facilities. At the time of the blaze, the headteacher 'Alan Tootill' admitted that they would not have had a new school building had the school not been burned to the ground.

Notable former pupils

 Leigh Halfpenny, rugby player
 Colin Jones, Welterweight boxer
 Adam Matthews, footballer
 Eli Walker, rugby player
 Tony Dibbin, radio presenter
 Jessica Sula, actress
 Matt Ryan (actor), Actor

References

External links
 
 The fire
 Rebuilding of the school
 Constructing excellence in Wales

News items
 New school opens in September 2009
 Rebuilding begins in February 2008
 
 18-year-old given six years for £8m of damage in fire in November 2006
 17-year-old convicted in October 2006
 17-year-old boasted about setting fire to the school
 Two 17-year-olds charged in May 2006
 Guardian April 2006
 Three arrests made in March 2006 over fire
 Blaze in March 2006

Video clips
 New school opens in September 2009
 Blaze in 2006 (poor quality)

Educational institutions established in 1973
1973 establishments in Wales
Secondary schools in Swansea
School buildings in the United Kingdom destroyed by arson